Nelly is a 2004 French drama film directed by Laure Duthilleul and starring Sophie Marceau, Antoine Chappey, and Fabio Zenoni. Written by Laure Duthilleul, Jean-Pol Fargeau, and Pierre-Erwan Guillaume, the film is about the four days following the death of a small-town doctor, seen through the eyes of his wife, who is a nurse. The film was screened in the Un Certain Regard section at the 2004 Cannes Film Festival.

Cast
 Sophie Marceau as Nelly
 Antoine Chappey as Jose
 Fabio Zenoni as Serge
 Gérald Laroche as René
 Pôme Auzier as Jeanne
 Jonas Capelier as Pedro
 Louis Lubat as Étienne
 Clotilde Hesme as Mathilde
 Sébastien Derlich as Manuel
 Marie Lubat as Mamie Antoinette
 Jeanette Duprat as Mamie Marie
 Catherine Davenier as Janette
 Martin Lartigue as Martin
 Lise Lamétrie as Marie-France

References

External links
 

2004 films
2004 drama films
2000s French-language films
French drama films
Films directed by Laure Duthilleul
2000s French films